Don Budge and Alice Marble successfully defended their title, defeating Henner Henkel and Sarah Fabyan in the final, 6–1, 6–4 to win the mixed doubles tennis title at the 1938 Wimbledon Championships.

Seeds

  Don Budge /  Alice Marble (champions)
  Henner Henkel /  Sarah Fabyan (final)
  Gene Mako /  Jadwiga Jędrzejowska (second round)
  Dragutin Mitić /  Simonne Mathieu (second round)
  Christian Boussus /  Nancye Wynne (quarterfinals)
  Jean Borotra /  Helen Moody (quarterfinals)
  John Olliff /  Bobbie Heine Miller (quarterfinals)
  Jacques Brugnon /  Thelma Coyne (quarterfinals)

Draw

Finals

Top half

Section 1

Section 2

Section 3

Section 4

Bottom half

Section 5

Section 6

The nationality of Mrs WT Cooke is unknown.

Section 7

Section 8

References

External links

X=Mixed Doubles
Wimbledon Championship by year – Mixed doubles